Jasmine Tatjana Anette Valentin (stage name Jasmine, born Helsinki, 22 August 1976) is a Finnish Romani singer.

She represented Finland in the Eurovision Song Contest 1996 by song Niin kaunis on taivas and became 23rd. After Eurovision she gigged in different countries including Turkey, Spain and Greece.

References

1976 births
Living people
Eurovision Song Contest entrants of 1996
Eurovision Song Contest entrants for Finland
20th-century Finnish women singers
Finnish Romani people
Romani singers
21st-century Finnish women singers